Red Dust is a 1990 Taiwanese drama film directed by Ho Yim. The film follows the life of an independent-minded woman writer during the Japanese occupation who falls in love with a man collaborating with the Japanese.

Awards at the Taiwan Golden Horse Awards 1990

Best Picture
Best Director (Yim Ho)
Best Actress (Brigitte Lin)
Best Supporting Actress (Maggie Cheung)
Best Cinematography (Poon Hang-Sang)
Best Costume & Make-up Design (Edith Cheung)
Best Art Direction (Edith Cheung & Jessinta Liu)
Best Original Film Score (Shut Git-Wing)

References

External links 

1990 drama films
1990 films
Taiwanese drama films